The 1965 Dartmouth Indians football team represented Dartmouth College during the 1965 NCAA University Division football season. The Indians were led by 11th-year head coach Bob Blackman and played their home games at Memorial Field in Hanover, New Hampshire. They finished with a perfect record of 9–0, winning the Ivy League title and the Lambert-Meadowlands Trophy, which signified them as champions of the East.

Schedule

References

Dartmouth
Dartmouth Big Green football seasons
Ivy League football champion seasons
Lambert-Meadowlands Trophy seasons
Dartmouth Indians football